Sukhendu Maity ( – 16 December 2019) was an Indian politician from West Bengal belonging to Communist Party of India. He was a legislator of the West Bengal Legislative Assembly.

Biography
Maity was elected as a legislator of the West Bengal Legislative Assembly from Kanthi Dakshin in 1987.

Maity died on 16 December 2019 at the age of 92.

References

1920s births
2019 deaths
Communist Party of India politicians from West Bengal
West Bengal MLAs 1987–1991
People from Purba Medinipur district